Julie Halard-Decugis was the defending champion, but decided to compete in Gold Coast at the same week.

Anne Kremer won the title by defeating Cara Black 6–4, 6–4 in the final.

Seeds

Draw

Finals

Top half

Bottom half

References
 
Official results archive (ITF)
 Official results archive (WTA)

WTA Auckland Open